Plane Space was a contemporary art gallery located in the Greenwich Village district of Manhattan.  The gallery featured mixed media work by emerging to mid-career artists in the U.S. and abroad.

Plane Space opened on August 28, 2002, in an 1855 firehouse.  Its mission was to show the most engaging contemporary art being created today. The interior of the gallery was designed by the New York-based firm Deborah Berke & Partners Architects.  Its  ground floor space housed over 40 shows in its life span and closed in December 2008.

The gallery's programming consisted of eight exhibitions annually of emerging to mid-career American and international artists working in sculpture, installation, drawing, painting, photography, and video.

Plane Space featured a summer artist residency program. A selected artist living outside of New York City was invited to live in the quarters above the gallery and work in the exhibition space during Plane Space's dormant month of August. As a result, each season, began with a site-specific installation. In 2007 the summer resident was British artist Zoe Mendelson and in 2008 the final summer resident was American artist Emily Counts.

References

External links 
 

Fire stations completed in 1855
Contemporary art galleries in the United States
Defunct fire stations in New York (state)
Fire stations in New York City
2002 establishments in New York City
2008 disestablishments in New York (state)
Defunct art museums and galleries in Manhattan
Art galleries established in 2002
Art galleries disestablished in 2008